The 2021 season was Helsingin Jalkapalloklubi's 113th competitive season.

Season Events
On 30 November, HJK announced the signing of Anthony Olusanya from FF Jaro on a two-year contract, with the option of a third.

On 19 January, Joel Untersee signed a one-year contract with HJK.

On 23 February, HJK announced the signing of Luís Henrique on a season-long loan deal from Vejle.

On 3 March, HJK announced the season-long loan signing of Didi from SOL FC, with an option to make the move permanent.

On 21 March, Logan Rogerson signed for HJK on a one-year contract, with the option of another two years, from Auckland City.

On 4 April, HJK announced the signing of Janne Saksela on a one-year contract, with the option of a second, from Ilves.

On 20 April, Dylan Murnane joined HJK on a short-term contract until July after impressing on trial. The following day, Sebastian Dahlström returned to HJK on a one-year contract having left Sheriff Tiraspol earlier in the year.

On 25 April, Enoch Banza moved to Raufoss.

On 21 June, Atomu Tanaka extended his contract with HJK until the end of the 2022 season.

On 28 June, Miro Tenho extended his contract with HJK until the end of the 2023 season.

On 17 July, HJK announced the signing of Marcello Beuker from Heerenveen on a contract until the end of the 2021 season.

On 22 July, Tim Sparv signed for HJK on a contract until the end of the 2022 season. The following day, 23 July, Joel Untersee left HJK by mutual consent.

On 4 August, HJK announced the signing of Santeri Hostikka from Pogoń Szczecin on a contract until the end of 2022. The following day, 5 August, HJK announced the signing of Taddeus Nkeng from Olimpik Donetsk on a contract until the end of 2022, with Baba Mensah signing on a contract until the end of the season, with the option of an additional season, from Ilves on 6 August.

On 16 August, HJK announced the signing of Patrik Raitanen on a contract until the end of the season. Whilst on the same day HJK also announced that Dylan Murnane had been released by the club, Logan Rogerson had joined Haka on loan and Luís Henrique's loan had been ended early.

Squad

On loan

Left the club during the season

Transfers

In

 Transfers announced on the above date, being finalised on 1 January 2020.

Loans in

Out

Loans out

Released

Friendlies

Competitions

Veikkausliiga

Regular season

Results summary

Results by matchday

Results

Table

Championship round

Results summary

Results by matchday

Results

Table

Finnish Cup

Sixth round

Knockout stage

Final

UEFA Champions League

Qualifying rounds

UEFA Europa League

Qualifying rounds

UEFA Europa Conference League

Group stage

Squad statistics

Appearances and goals

|-
|colspan="14"|Players from Klubi-04 who appeared:
|-
|colspan="14"|Players away from the club on loan:

|-
|colspan="14"|Players who left HJK during the season:

|}

Goal scorers

Clean sheets

Disciplinary record

Notes

References

2021
HJK
2021–22 UEFA Champions League participants seasons
2021–22 UEFA Europa League participants seasons
2021–22 UEFA Europa Conference League participants seasons